Jere Laaksonen (born February 28, 1991) is a Finnish ice hockey player.

Laaksonen made his SM-liiga debut playing with Lukko during the 2011–12 SM-liiga season.

References

External links

1991 births
Living people
Arystan Temirtau players
ESV Kaufbeuren players
Finnish ice hockey centres
HC Temirtau players
Hokki players
Ilves players
Lempäälän Kisa players
Lukko players
Saryarka Karagandy players
Vaasan Sport players
Yuzhny Ural Orsk players